Oneworld (stylized as oneworld; CRS: *O) is an airline alliance founded on 1 February 1999. The alliance's stated objective is to be the first choice airline alliance for the world's frequent international travellers. Its central alliance office is in New York City and includes 13 member airlines: Alaska Airlines, American Airlines, British Airways, Cathay Pacific, Finnair, Iberia, Japan Airlines, Malaysia Airlines, Qantas, Qatar Airways, Royal Air Maroc, Royal Jordanian and SriLankan Airlines, as well as Fiji Airways as a Oneworld Connect partner. On 20 June 2022, Oman Air announced it would formally join the alliance by 2024.

 its member airlines collectively operate a fleet of 3,296 aircraft, serve about 1,000 airports in 170 countries, carrying over 490 million passengers per year on 13,000 plus daily departures. It is the third-largest global airline alliance in terms of passengers carried, behind SkyTeam (676M in 2019) and Star Alliance (762M in 2019).

Management
Oneworld announced formation of a central alliance team, the Oneworld Management Company (oMC), in February 2000, to mark the alliance's first anniversary. The oMC was established May 2000 in Vancouver, British Columbia, Canada, and in June 2011 relocated to New York City. It acts as the alliance's central secretariat, with responsibility for driving future growth and the launch of new customer services and benefits.

The oMC was first led by managing partner Peter Buecking, previously director of sales and marketing at Cathay Pacific; followed by John McCulloch, previously the alliance's vice-president for marketing. Bruce Ashby, who previously held roles of CEO of Saudi Arabia's SAMA Airlines, CEO of India's IndiGo, and executive vice-president for US Airways, became CEO in December 2011. Rob Gurney succeeded Ashby as CEO in October 2016.

Reporting to the CEO are vice-presidents for commercial; membership and customer experience; and corporate communications, a chief financial officer and an IT director.

The CEO reports to the Oneworld Governing Board, which is made up of the chief executives of each of the member airlines. The Governing Board meets regularly to set strategic direction and review progress. Chairmanship of the board rotates among the alliance members' chief executives. Qatar Airways CEO Akbar Al Baker succeeded Qantas CEO as chairman in May 2021.

Headquarters
In 2011, the alliance headquarters relocated from Vancouver, Canada, to Park Avenue in New York City, sharing premises with the local offices of a number of Oneworld member airlines including American Airlines, British Airways, Cathay Pacific, Finnair, Japan Airlines and Qantas.

The headquarters of the Oneworld alliance will be moving to Fort Worth, Texas, where American Airlines is headquartered in December 2022.

Membership history

New global alliance

Oneworld was unveiled by its founding members, American Airlines, British Airways, Canadian Airlines International, Cathay Pacific and Qantas at a press conference in London, United Kingdom, on 21 September 1998. Oneworld was officially launched and became operational on 1 February 1999.
The alliance outlined its services and benefits as including:
 Smoother transfers for passengers travelling across all member airlines
 Greater support to passengers regardless of which member airline they are travelling with
 Greater range of round-the-world products
 Enhanced co‑operation in the member airlines' frequent-flyer programmmes to provide more rewards
 Wider recognition and access to more airport lounges.
 More codeshare agreements and connecting flights between member airlines

Ahead of the official launch, the alliance embarked on an extensive employee communications and training programme, involving virtually all of the 220,000 staff employed by the five-member airlines, to ensure they could deliver what the alliance brand promised. At its launch in 1999, Oneworld's member airlines and their affiliates served 648 destinations in 139 countries and carried 181 million passengers with a fleet of 1,577 aircraft.

First additional members

Finnair, Finland's largest airline and flag carrier, was the alliance's first new recruit on 9 December 1998. The alliance welcomed Iberia, Spain's flag carrier, as its second recruit on 15 February 1999. Both airlines, together with Iberia's franchisee, Iberia Regional Air Nostrum, joined the alliance on 1 September 1999, adding more than 50 destinations to the Oneworld network.

On 19 May 1999, LanChile became a member-elect, the alliance's first representative from Latin America. LanChile's two subsidiaries, LAN Express and LAN Perú, would also join the alliance. Irish flag carrier Aer Lingus was formally elected on board and confirmed as the ninth member of the alliance on 2 December 1999. As LanChile and Aer Lingus joined on 1 June 2000, Canadian Airlines International left the alliance, following the airline's purchase by Air Canada, a member of the rival Star Alliance.

Swiss International Air Lines (Swiss) accepted an invitation to join Oneworld in September 2003, after signing a memorandum of understanding (MOU) on 23 September 2003 to establish a wide-ranging commercial agreement with British Airways. However, Swiss later decided not to proceed with key elements of its agreement with British Airways and was therefore released from its commitment to join Oneworld; it was taken over by Lufthansa in 2005 and joined Star Alliance in 2006.

2005–2006: The first big expansion drive

The mid-2000s saw Oneworld undertake one of the biggest expansions in its history. Hungarian flag carrier Malév signed an MOU in May 2005 as a precursor to a formal invitation to join, extended in November 2005. On 17 October 2005, the alliance signed as a member-elect Royal Jordanian, the first airline from the Middle East to accept an invitation to join any global airline alliance.

Japan Airlines, then Asia's largest airline group, applied to join the alliance on 25 October 2005. JAL and Oneworld exchanged an MOU on 8 February 2006, setting out a framework for the remaining steps to be taken before the airline could be formally invited to join. On 5 June 2006, JAL accepted a formal letter of invitation to join the alliance, along with five members of the JAL Group as affiliate members, including J-Air, JAL Express, JALways, Japan Asia Airways and Japan Transocean Air.

All three of these airline groups — Japan Airlines, Malév and Royal Jordanian — joined as full members and started offering the alliance's full range of services and benefits on 1 April 2007, along with, as Oneworld affiliate members, Japan Airlines' subsidiaries J‑Air, JAL Express, JALways, Japan Asia Airways and Japan Transocean Air, and LAN's subsidiaries LAN Argentina and LAN Ecuador. They expanded the Oneworld network to almost 700 airports in nearly 150 countries served by 9,000 daily departures, carrying around 315 million passengers per year with a fleet of almost 2,500 aircraft, with top-tier frequent flyers able to access 400 airport lounges worldwide.

On the same day, Aer Lingus voluntarily exited the alliance due to a fundamental change to its business strategy. The Irish carrier was repositioning itself as a low fares point-to-point carrier, while Oneworld's focus was on the multisector, premium, frequent international travellers' market. Although no longer an Oneworld member, Aer Lingus maintained frequent-flyer programme partnerships with some of the alliance members and continued to participate in the alliance's Global Explorer round-the-world fare product.

In February 2012, Malév suspended all services indefinitely, citing financial difficulties. Its participation in Oneworld ended when the airline was wound up in the following weeks.

2009–2011: New recruits and expansion 

On 26 May 2009, Russian airline S7 Airlines was unanimously elected to the alliance. It became a full member on 15 November 2010, adding to Oneworld one of the most extensive networks covering Russia and the Commonwealth of Independent States (CIS). It expanded the Oneworld network to another 54 cities, 35 of them in Russia. The airline's subsidiary Globus Airlines joined Oneworld at the same time as an affiliate member.

On 10 November 2009, Oneworld welcomed Mexicana and its subsidiaries, MexicanaClick and MexicanaLink, after the airline accepted a formal invitation to join the alliance on 9 April 2008. Mexicana and its affiliates added 26 destinations to the alliance map. Mexicana was a former member of Star Alliance, leaving the group in March 2004 when it terminated its codeshare agreement with United Airlines and opted for bilateral agreements with Oneworld members American Airlines and Iberia. On 2 August 2010, Mexicana filed for insolvency proceedings in Mexico and bankruptcy protection in the United States with its financial situation deteriorating. The airline suspended all operations from 28 August 2010. With the group under Mexican court protection, it has remained an inactive member of Oneworld since then.

On 23 February 2010, India's Kingfisher Airlines took its first step to joining Oneworld with its chairman Vijay Mallya and chief executives from the alliance's existing member airlines signing a memorandum of understanding, subject to Indian regulatory approval. The airline gained approval to join the alliance from the India's Ministry of Civil Aviation and started participating in the alliance's Global Explorer round-the-world fare product. However, on 3 February 2012, just a week before it was due to join the alliance, Kingfisher Airlines' entry was put on hold to give it more time to strengthen its financial position. Kingfisher Airlines suspended operations on 20 October 2012 and finally ceased operations in February 2013.

On 26 July 2010, Air Berlin, at that time Germany's second-largest airline, accepted an invitation to join Oneworld and joined the alliance on 20 March 2012.

On 6 June 2011, Malaysia Airlines became a new member designate on the sidelines of the IATA World Air Transport Summit in Singapore. Malaysia Airlines became a part of Oneworld on 1 February 2013.

2012–present: The second big expansion

On 11 June 2012, SriLankan Airlines became Oneworld's latest member-elect, on the sidelines of the IATA World Air Transport Summit in Beijing. Cathay Pacific is serving SriLankan Airlines as its sponsor through its alliance implementation programme. Its membership implementation was expected to take around 18 months. On 1 May 2014, SriLankan Airlines became a full-member of the alliance making it the first airline in the Indian subcontinent to join any alliance.

On 8 October 2012, Qatar Airways became a member-elect of Oneworld. Qatar Airways was one of the fastest growing airlines worldwide—adding 15 destinations in 2012 alone—and one of the most highly regarded, having been named Airline of the Year by the Skytrax independent airline quality ratings agency in both 2011 and 2012. The agreement to join was widely reported in the media as a coup for Oneworld, with Qatar Airways the first among the "Big Three" carriers in the Persian Gulf to sign for any global airline alliance. The airline joined the alliance on 30 October 2013.

On 14 February 2013, American Airlines began plans to merge with US Airways. Following U.S. Federal Aviation Administration approval, the merger was completed on 9 December 2013. US Airways left Star Alliance on 30 March 2014, and joined Oneworld as an affiliate member the following day.

On 7 March 2013, LATAM Airlines Group chose Oneworld as its alliance and announced that LAN subsidiary LAN Colombia plus TAM Airlines and its subsidiary TAM Paraguay would join Oneworld. LAN Colombia joined the alliance on 1 October 2013.

On 31 March 2014, TAM Airlines and US Airways joined Oneworld after leaving Star Alliance on 30 March 2014.

On 15 August 2017, Air Berlin filed for insolvency after Abu Dhabi-based Etihad Airways stopped funding the airline. Air Berlin subsequently left Oneworld upon entering administration and ceasing operations on 28 October 2017.

On 1 June 2018, Oneworld introduced Oneworld Connect, a membership platform similar to Star Alliance's "Connecting Partners", with Fiji Airways as the first member effective from 5 December onwards.

On 5 December 2018, Oneworld announced Royal Air Maroc as a member-elect, and the airline joined the alliance on 1 April 2020, extending the alliance's network into Africa.

On 26 September 2019, SkyTeam member Delta Air Lines announced its plans to buy 20% of LATAM for $1.9 billion. This acquisition effectively removed LATAM Airlines Group from Oneworld on 1 May 2020, but the fate of Qatar Airways' 10% stake in LATAM is currently unannounced.

On 31 March 2021, Alaska Airlines and its affiliates Alaska Horizon and Alaska SkyWest joined the alliance as member and member affiliates, respectively.

On 20 June 2022, Oman Air and Oneworld signed the MOU for Oman Air to join the alliance during IATA General Meeting in Doha. Qatar Airways will act as their sponsor.

Subsidiaries and franchises

Besides its full member airlines, Oneworld also includes around 30 "affiliate" members. These are generally regional airlines that are either owned by or have strong commercial links with the alliance's full members. For customers, they further extend the network the alliance can offer. In governance terms, these affiliates are represented in Oneworld affairs by their "parent" airline.

Air Liberté ceased to be an affiliate member of Oneworld when the French airline was sold by British Airways to French investment group Taitbout with the UK carrier explaining that it had been unable to receive adequate returns on its investment in the business. Kenya-based Regional Air joined the alliance on 1 July 2001, following its franchising agreement with British Airways. British Airways terminated its franchise agreement with Regional Air when the African carrier suspended flights in mid April 2005, ending its affiliate membership of Oneworld. TWA's regional carriers, which operated under the Trans World Express brand, became Oneworld affiliate members, as their name changed to AmericanConnection on 2 December 2001, following TWA's acquisition by American Airlines. Three airlines operated under the AmericanConnection brand at that time: Chautauqua Airlines, Corporate Airlines, and Trans States Airlines.

The alliance further strengthened its network in Latin America when LAN's two subsidiaries, LAN Argentina and LAN Ecuador, became the alliance's newest affiliate members. LAN Argentina launched passenger and cargo services in June 2005 from its home base in Buenos Aires, while LAN Ecuador launched its services in April 2003 from its home base in Guayaquil. Both airlines officially joined their sister airlines and offer alliance's services and benefits on 1 April 2007.

Conversely, on 5 March 2007, the alliance ended its relationship with affiliate member and British Airways subsidiary, BA Connect. BA Connect's UK regional operations were sold to Flybe on 3 November 2006, in return for a 15% stake in the latter. Approximately 50 UK regional routes are affected by the sale; however, Belfast and Southampton would remain linked to the alliance network through other British Airways and alliance members. BA Connect's operations from London City Airport and between Manchester and New York were retained and operated by another British Airways subsidiary, BA CityFlyer, and the airline itself, respectively.

The alliance ended its relationship with affiliate member and British Airways franchisee BMED on 27 October 2007, following the purchase of the airline by one of British Airways' UK rivals, BMI. Four days later, Oneworld welcomed its latest affiliate member and Cathay Pacific wholly owned subsidiary Dragonair to the alliance on 1 November 2007. Dragonair had the biggest network into mainland China for a non-mainland based carrier, with about 400 departures a week.

In 2008, the alliance lost another two affiliate members as British Airways continued the strategy of reducing its UK franchises. The first franchisee, GB Airways, exited the alliance on 30 March 2008, following its purchase by EasyJet. British Airways intended to start services from London Heathrow to Faro, Portugal, and Málaga, Spain, and from London Gatwick to Faro, Gibraltar, Ibiza, Málaga, Palma, and Tunis, which were operated under the franchise. The alliance bid farewell to one of its affiliate member Japan Asia Airways on 31 March 2008, following the airline's consolidation into its parent, Japan Airlines. The second British Airways franchisee, Loganair, left the alliance on 25 October 2008, following the ending of its franchise agreement with the airline. A separate agreement for codesharing on some Loganair services replaced the previous franchise, for British Airways passengers connecting through Aberdeen, Edinburgh and Glasgow.

Tenth anniversary

In February 2009, Oneworld celebrated its tenth anniversary with its ten member airlines—American Airlines, British Airways, Cathay Pacific, Finnair, Iberia Airlines, Japan Airlines, LAN, Malév, Qantas, and Royal Jordanian. In the past decade, membership has doubled from an initial five members to ten members now; its member airlines carried a total of 2.5 billion passengers and generated almost $500 billion, €450 million in revenue from passenger activities. Alliance fares and sales products generated $5 billion, €2.5 billion in revenue alone, with two-thirds or almost $3 billion, €1.5 billion would not have been generated if the alliance did not exist. As part of the celebration and to increase awareness of the 10‑member alliance, all the alliance member airlines decorated a proportion of their aircraft fleets in a new standard Oneworld livery—around 40 aircraft in total, mainly types that fly on international routes. The alliance also unveiled a special version of its logo, featuring the text "10 years" printed behind the word Oneworld as a watermark on its round blue orb.

Member airlines

Full members and their affiliates 

Founding member
On routes operated on behalf of Alaska Airlines as Alaska SkyWest only
American Eagle flights are operated by Envoy Air, Mesa Airlines, Piedmont Airlines, PSA Airlines, Republic Airways and SkyWest Airlines
Independently operated franchise carriers using the British Airways name, livery and flight code
On routes operated on behalf of Finnair only
 Iberia Regional flights are operated by Air Nostrum
QantasLink flights are operated by Eastern Australia Airlines, Network Aviation and Sunstate Airlines

Connect partners and their affiliates

Future members and their affiliates

Suspended members and member affiliates

Former members and member affiliates

Former member affiliates of current member airlines 

Founding member affiliate
 AmericanConnection flights were operated by Chautauqua Airlines, RegionsAir and Trans States Airlines
Merged with Cathay Pacific on 21 October 2020
Merged with SriLankan Airlines on 31 October 2016
 Merged with American Airlines on 17 October 2015
 US Airways Express flights were operated by Air Wisconsin, Mesa Airlines, Piedmont Airlines, PSA Airlines, Republic Airways and SkyWest Airlines

Benefits and services

Member hubs

Co-location
Co-location provides alliance customers with smoother transfers between member airlines and better facilities than any of the member airlines could justify on their own. The alliance has combined ticket offices, check-in facilities and lounges at some 50 airports worldwide.

Customer service initiatives

Interline electronic ticket
On 21 April 2005, Oneworld became the first airline alliance to enable its customers to fly throughout its members' network on electronic tickets (e-tickets) only, with the completion of interline e-ticketing (IET) links between all its member airlines.

Awards and recognitions

Livery and logo
All alliance members' aircraft bear a Oneworld logo,  in diameter, on the right of the first set of entry doors behind the cockpit.

Japan Airlines – 2007 special Oneworld livery
In 2007, Japan Airlines (JAL) painted two of its Boeing 777 aircraft, a Boeing 777-200ER (JA704J) and a Boeing 777-300 (JA8941), in a special Oneworld livery to mark its entrance into the alliance. The first aircraft (JA704J) took off from the airline's main international hub Tokyo Narita International Airport as Japan Airlines Flight 441 bound for Moscow on 16 April 2007. The design featured "a huge globe in the distinctive horizon blue of Oneworld, painted on the centre of the aircraft, with a stylised motif to symbolise the convenience, comfort, value and choice available to passengers throughout the alliance's comprehensive global network".

Standard Oneworld livery
The new (optional) standard Oneworld livery was introduced as part of the alliance's tenth anniversary celebration in February 2009. The name of the operating member airline will be placed in smaller lettering in a standard position at the front of the aircraft below the alliance name and logo. Each member airline will also retain its regular tailfin design.

References

External links

 

1999 in aviation
1999 establishments in New York (state)
Airline alliances
Airlines based in New York (state)

Airlines established in 1999
 
Organizations established in 1999
Transportation companies based in New York City